Dan Zakhem (May 13, 1958 – February 22, 1994) was an Israeli performance artist and sculptor.

Biography
Dan Zakhem was born in Tel Aviv in 1958. From 1983 to 1985, after returning from studying art in Montreal, Quebec, Canada, he worked as an art director and graphic designer. In 1988 he established, together with Tamar Raban and Anat Schen, an organization called "Shelter 209", a non-profit organization for the advancement of performance art in Israel.

Alongside ceremonial and Shamanistic performances, such as "Falling Asleep on a Forest's Nipple" (1985), he created performances with post-modern artificial and spectacular characteristics, such as "The Babel Party" (1984). 

In many of his works he created deliberate blurring between art and life. In 1986 he was diagnosed with the HIV virus. Under this influence has created a series of works in which ballet of death as a central motif.

Death
In 1994 he died of a brain tumor caused by AIDS.

Education
1974–76 Talma-Yalin High School, Givatayim, Israel
1978–79 Classical Ballet, Bat Dor, Tel Aviv, Israel
1979–82 B.F.A. Major Studio Arts, Concordia University, Montreal, Quebec, Canada
1983 Gray Adams Steps Schools, New York City
1983 Fashion, television, theatre make-up, Audrey Morris & Co, Montreal, Quebec, Canada

Teaching 
1990 Art Teachers College, Ramat Hasharon, multimedia

Prizes
1987 Second prize, for the performance "Impressions from Above: a Phenomenon", Israel Festival, Jerusalem
1991 Young Artist Prize, The Ministry of Education, Culture and Sport

Selected performances

Selected exhibitions

References

General references
 
 http://www.danzakhem.com/
 The Babel Party 1984
 Meditation #2 1990
 Impressions from Above – A Phenomenon 1987
 Live – Life 1993
 The Majesty of Absence 1991
 Dennis the Menace Nomad 1990
 Shelter 209 in Memory of Dan Zakhem

1958 births
1994 deaths
Artists from Tel Aviv
Thelma Yellin High School of Arts alumni
Concordia University alumni
Israeli performance artists
Israeli male sculptors
Israeli expatriates in Canada
20th-century Israeli sculptors
20th-century Israeli male artists
Deaths from brain cancer in Israel
AIDS-related deaths in Israel
Burials at Kiryat Shaul Cemetery